Friends' School (known as Walden School from 2016–17) was a Quaker independent school located in Saffron Walden, Essex, situated approximately 12 miles south of the city of Cambridge, England. The school was co-educational and accommodated children between the ages of three and 18 (boarders and day pupils).

The school closed at the end of the 2017 summer term.

History
Friends' School, Saffron Walden was founded as part of the Quakers' Clerkenwell workhouse in Islington in London in 1703, 50 years after George Fox. The workhouse was for children and the elderly and the school moved out as a separate entity in 1786. It was now nearby in Clerkenwell and now known as the Friends' School. However the new building was damp and ill suited to teaching and learning.

In 1825 the school began operation in Croydon. There was initially 120 places for students who began at the age of nine. Children did not have to be members of the Quakers but these children were accepted first. In 1828 the school had a marriage when Elizabeth Hutchinson married Edward Foster Brady. They were both teachers and both former pupils of the school. In 1833 they became joint heads of the school, although Edward was ill and had been consumptive. He died in 1838 and Elizabeth Brady led the school until 1842.

In 1876 the mayor of Saffron Waldon offered a new site for the school and in 1879 the school opened in Saffron Walden.

In September 2016 the school changed its name to Walden School.

On 11 May 2017 it was announced that Walden School would close at the end of the 2016–17 school year.

Notable former pupils and associates

 Harriett Baldwin, MP for West Worcestershire
 Edward Bawden, English painter, illustrator, graphic artist and WWII war artist
 Elizabeth Brady, student here and head of the school
 Judi Dench, actress, Quaker and patron of Walden School
 Carola Dunn, author of romance and detective novels
 Ralph Erskine, Sweden-based architect and planner (pupil from 1925 to 1931)
 Matthew Evans, chairman and former managing director of Faber and Faber Ltd, and member of the House of Lords
 Margery Fish, gardener and writer
 Imogen Heap, singer-songwriter, record producer and audio engineer
 Diana Wynne Jones, novelist, poet and academic (pupil from 1946 to 1952)
 E. V. Lucas, humorist, essayist and playwright
 Tony Newton (Lord Newton of Braintree), politician
 Deborah Norton, actress
 John Peet, journalist and translator of Karl Marx
 Matthew Robinson, executive producer of Byker Grove and EastEnders and founder of Khmer Mekong Films (pupil from 1958 to 1963)
 Tom Robinson, singer-songwriter and broadcaster (pupil from 1961 to 1967)
 Jeremy Shearmur, philosopher at Australian National University
 Malcolm Shepherd, politician, businessman and member of the House of Lords (pupil from 1929 to 1935)
 Sally Tuffin, fashion designer and ceramicist
 Emily Young, sculptor

In popular culture
Carola Dunn's book Anthem for Doomed Youth is set at the school.

See also
 List of Friends Schools

References

Further reading
 The Avenue (school magazine).
 Bolam, W. D. (1952).  Unbroken community: The story of the Friends' School, Saffron Walden, 1702–1952.
 Buss, R. (2003). A Community through three centuries.
 Crosfield, J. B. (1902). Saffron Walden School: a sketch of two hundred years.
 Halter, H. (2002). The School on the hill: memories of three hundred years of Friends' School, Saffron Walden, 1702–2002.
 Hitchcock, T. V. (ed.) (1987). Richard Hutton's complaints book: the notebook of the steward of the Quaker workhouse at Clerkenwell 1711–1737.
 OSA Annual reports, at Essex Record Office, Chelmsford. 
 Saffron Walden Weekly. Local newspaper founded in 1889.  Good coverage of Friends School.
 Woods, J. C. (1979). Friends School: A hundred years at Saffron Walden 1879–1979.

External links
 
 Obituary of Lord Malcolm Shepherd

1702 establishments in England
Co-educational boarding schools
Defunct schools in Essex
Educational institutions disestablished in 2017
Educational institutions established in 1702
Quaker schools in England